The Book of Kane is a collection of fantasy short stories by Karl Edward Wagner featuring his character Kane.  It was first published in 1985 by Donald M. Grant, Publisher, Inc. in an edition of 2,125 copies, of which 425 copies were signed and slipcased.  The first story first appeared in Wagner's earlier collection Death Angel's Shadow.  The other stories originally appeared in the magazines Sorcerer's Apprentice, Escape! and Chacal. The collection is illustrated by Jeffrey Jones.

Contents
 "Reflections for the Winter of My Soul"
 "Misericorde"
 "The Other One"
 "Sing a Last Song of Valdese"
 "Raven’s Eyrie"

References

1985 short story collections
Fantasy short story collections
Karl Edward Wagner
Donald M. Grant, Publisher books